Kerry Maher-Shaffer (born January 15, 1984) is a Canadian rower.

Career
Maher-Shaffer won the singles sculls event at the Canadian Championships in 2010. Maher-Shaffer competed at three World Rowing Championships, finishing 13th in 2011 in the women's double sculls, fifth in the women's fours in 2014 and finally sixth in 2016 in the women's fours.

At the 2015 Pan American Games in Toronto, Canada (the rowing competitions were held in St. Catharines), Maher-Shaffer won two gold medals in the quadruple sculls and double sculls events.

References

1984 births
Living people
Canadian female rowers
Rowers at the 2015 Pan American Games
Pan American Games medalists in rowing
Pan American Games gold medalists for Canada
Medalists at the 2015 Pan American Games
Sportspeople from Welland
21st-century Canadian women